Saxifraga cochlearis, called the spoon-leaved saxifrage, is a species of flowering plant in the genus Saxifraga, native to the Alpes Maritimes of France and the adjoining Italian region of Liguria. Its 'Minor' subtaxon has gained the Royal Horticultural Society's Award of Garden Merit.

References

cochlearis
Flora of France
Flora of Italy
Plants described in 1832